Aquibacillus halophilus is a Gram-positive, rod-shaped and strictly aerobic bacterium from the genus of Aquibacillus.

References

Bacillaceae
Bacteria described in 2015